Empire Palace may refer to 

A number of cinemas run by Moss Empires with this name
, a British coaster in service 1945-49